The 1960 United States Senate election in New Jersey was held on November 8, 1960. Incumbent Republican Clifford P. Case defeated Democratic nominee Thorn Lord with 55.69% of the vote.

Primary elections
Primary elections were held on April 19, 1960.

Democratic primary

Candidates	
Thorn Lord, chair of the Mercer County Democratic Party and former United States Attorney for the District of New Jersey
Richard M. Glassner, Newark attorney

Results

Republican primary

Candidates
Clifford P. Case, incumbent United States Senator
David Dearborn, Union County businessman
Robert J. Morris, anti-communist activist

Results

General election

Candidates
Major party candidates
Clifford P. Case, Republican
Thorn Lord, Democratic

Other candidates
Winifred O. Perry, Independent
Gladys Grauer, Socialist Workers
Albert Ronis, Socialist Labor

Results

References

1960
New Jersey
United States Senate